Etheresia Pretorius is a South African scientist. She is Distinguished Professor and head of the Department of  Physiological Sciences at Stellenbosch University. Her research deals with coagulation in a variety of medical conditions including type 2 diabetes, chronic fatigue syndrome, Alzheimer’s, Parkinson’s, COVID-19 and Long COVID.

Education 
Pretorius earned a BScHons (cum laude) and MSc from Stellenbosch University, then a PhD from the University of Pretoria in 1998.

Career 
Following her doctorate, Pretorius became a lecturer in Department of Anatomy at the University of Pretoria, and later joined the Department of Physiology. She now works at Stellenbosch University, where she is Distinguished Professor and head of the Department of  Physiological Sciences.

Her research deals with coagulation in a variety of medical conditions including type 2 diabetes, chronic fatigue syndrome, Alzheimer’s, Parkinson’s, COVID-19 and Long COVID. Her 2021 study was the first to propose microclots could play a role in Long COVID. She often collaborates with biochemist Douglas Kell and they led the first team to visualize microclots in Long COVID.

According to Scopus, Pretorius has an h-index of 45. In 2011, she won the African Union Kwame Nkrumah Scientific Awards for the Southern Region in the Basic Science, Technology and Innovation Sector.

References

External links
 "Interview with Resia Pretorius: how bacteria, viruses and their inflammatory products can impact blood clotting in chronic disease", August 6, 2020

Living people
Academic staff of Stellenbosch University
South African scientists
South African women scientists
Year of birth missing (living people)